Scott Anthony Hans Fuglistaller (born 16 April 1987) is a New Zealand rugby union professional footballer. He plays for, and captains, the Melbourne Rebels in Super Rugby and the Melbourne Rising in the National Rugby Championship. His regular playing position is openside flanker.

Early career
He played first XV rugby for Francis Douglas Memorial College in New Plymouth, and club rugby in Wellington.

Super Rugby
In New Zealand, Fuglistaller represented the Highlanders and made his debut in 2012.

In 2011 and 2012, Fuglistaller did not play. Like many, he viewed the Rebels defence as lacking. However, in 2013 he was among the squad's fit young recruits expected to bring a hard edge to the Rebels defence and attack.

His rivals for the openside flank were rugby league convert Jarrod Saffy and Rebels newcomer Jordy Reid.

In the opening round of the 2013 Super Rugby season, Fuglistaller made his Rebels debut against the Western Force, and played for 64 minutes before being replaced by Saffy. He was named to play against the ACT Brumbies the following week, and expected to face strong competition from Wallabies flanker David Pocock.

In 2014, despite competition for the open side flanker position from Reid and Australian Sevens rep Sean McMahon the Rebels extended Fuglistaller's contract through until the end of the 2016 Super Rugby season.

On 6 February 2015 Fuglistaller was appointed co-captain of the Rebels alongside incumbent captain Scott Higginbotham.

On 7 August 2015, Fuglistaller snd his Rebels teammate Colby Fainga'a were appointed co-captains of the Melbourne Rising for the 2015 National Rugby Championship season.

Super Rugby statistics

References

External links 
 Scott Fuglistaller player [rofile Melbourne Rebels

Living people
1987 births
New Zealand rugby union players
Rugby union flankers
Melbourne Rebels players
People educated at Francis Douglas Memorial College
Highlanders (rugby union) players
Wellington rugby union players
Rugby union players from Hāwera
New Zealand expatriate rugby union players
Expatriate rugby union players in Australia
Expatriate rugby union players in Japan
New Zealand expatriate sportspeople in Australia
Melbourne Rising players
Toyota Industries Shuttles Aichi players